The Desert Peach is a comic book created by Donna Barr,  chronicling the adventures of the eponymous protagonist, Erwin "The Desert Fox" Rommel's fictitious homosexual younger brother, Oberst Manfred Pfirsich Marie Rommel (1900–1990), nicknamed the "Desert Peach". Early issues of the comic focused on the Peach's command of a misfit unit of the Afrika Korps from 1940 to 1943; subsequent issues have explored the pre- and post-war lives of Pfirsich (German for "Peach") and his supporting cast.

Publication history
The Desert Peach was first published in 1988, by Thoughts and Images, later by MU Press/AEON, and still later by A Fine Line. 32 issues were released throughout the 1990s and early 2000s, and subsequently re-released in eight collected volumes; as well, a Desert Peach musical was produced in 1992, and Bread and Swans, a Desert Peach novel, was released in 2005. With the exception of the musical, all Desert Peach material has been created entirely by Barr.

Barr took Peach to the Modern Tales webcomics collective, where she explored Pfirsich's afterlife: wracked with guilt for having failed to save enough people from the Holocaust, he sentenced himself to Hell. The website ceased operations in 2012 and the comics were removed.

Inspiration
Barr has said that she was inspired to create the character while working in the file office of the University of Washington, which was being painted a "horrible half-pink, half-tan color."  Searching for a color name, she stumbled upon "desert peach", and was immediately inspired by the pun upon "The Desert Fox," the name given to Field Marshal Erwin Rommel during World War II . According to his biographers, Rommel had a youngest brother, named Manfred, who died in infancy—Barr said she only developed a personality who the universe had prematurely discarded.

Supporting cast

The Desert Peach commanded the 469th Halftrack, Gravedigging and Support Unit of the Afrika Korps: a catch-all for misfits, mavericks, and otherwise peculiar soldiers who, for whatever reason, were not suitable for service in the German Army but nonetheless were enlisted. In the words of their medical officer (a psychiatrist assigned to the 469th because his specialty was considered a "Jewish science"), it was a unit composed "entirely of stray puppies".

The 469th was based on an escarpment by the sea. Pfirsich was of the opinion that a commander should not merely lead his troops but protect them, and arranged with local Allied commanders that there would be no fighting in that area (although newcomers did not always accept this modus vivendi).

Throughout the series, Barr focused on many characters; the following list includes some of the most prominent.

Obergefreiter Udo Schmidt: Pfirsich's orderly and aide-de-camp. Scruffy, dirty, ill-tempered, dark-skinned, secretly Jewish, and with a habit of using pages from Mein Kampf as rolling papers, Schmidt was the 469th's only card-carrying member of the Nazi Party. He claimed that his reason for joining was that he had been very young and a desperate Party recruiter had bought him beer.
Leutnant Kjars Dagobert Winzig: the 469th's self-appointed political officer. A concert pianist in civilian life, the blond, blue-eyed Winzig was an enthusiastic, armband-wearing supporter of Hitler and Nazism. However, he was not actually a party member, since (as he shamefacedly explained) "party members have to pay dues".
Oberleutnant Rosen Kavalier: ace Luftwaffe pilot, and the Peach's fiancé. A cheerful adventurer, bold and brash, Rosen (whose real name, thanks to his British father, was Melvin Gonville Ramsbottom) once got Pfirsich drunk enough to have heterosexual sex for the first time, claiming that he should experience it at least once. This encounter led to the birth of Pfirsich's son.
Obergefreiter Heinrich Dobermann: munitions expert. As the result of a training accident on a minefield, Dobermann was brain-damaged, mildly insane, and addicted to several painkillers and psychotropic medications. As well, he adopted a live Tellermine 42 as a pet, naming it "Fridl".
 Kristof Falbe: the 469's mute radio operator. Never speaks, just taps the radio microphone to communicate. Always seen holding a small stuffed dinosaur.

Bibliography

 Thoughts and Images:
The Desert Peach #1: Who is This Man?
The Desert Peach #2: The Bar Fight
The Desert Peach #3: A Day At The Beach
The Desert Peach #4: Is There A Nazi In The House?
The Desert Peach #5: Flight Of Fancy
The Desert Peach #6: A Day Like Any Other
The Desert Peach #7: Spoiled Fruit
The Desert Peach #8: Dressing Down
The Desert Peach #9: Scourge Of Love
The Desert Peach #10: Two-Timers
The Desert Peach #11: Straight and Narrow
The Desert Peach #12: Child Of The World
The Desert Peach #13: Nobody
The Desert Peach #14: Surprise, Surprise
The Desert Peach #15: The Triangle Trade
The Desert Peach #16: Plight Of The Phoenix
The Desert Peach #17: Culture Shock
The Desert Peach #18: Musical Program
The Desert Peach #19: Self-Propelled Target
The Desert Peach #20: Fever Dreams
The Desert Peach #21: The Good Uncle
The Desert Peach #22: Lady Luck
The Desert Peach #23: Visions
The Desert Peach #24: Ups And Downs
The Desert Peach #25: Beautiful
The Desert Peach Collection: Beginnings (issues 1 - 3)
The Desert Peach Collection: Politics, Pilots and Puppies (issues 4 - 6)
The Desert Peach Collection: Foreign Relations (issues 7 - 9)
The Desert Peach Collection: Baby Games (issues 10 - 12)
The Desert Peach Collection: Belief Systems (issues 13 - 15)
The Desert Peach Collection: Marriage and Mayhem (issues 16, 17, 19)
Ersatz Peach
Peach Slices (first edition - sold out)
 A Fine Line Press (available at mupress till #30)
The Desert Peach #26: Miki
The Desert Peach #27: New And Different
The Desert Peach #28: Tongue
The Desert Peach #29: Out Of The East
The Desert Peach #30: Headaches
The Desert Peach #31: Pithed
The Desert Peach #32: Keeper
Peach Slices (second edition, with additional artwork and Desert Peach #25)
Seven Peaches contains the first seven Desert Peach issues
Bread and Swans, the Desert Peach Novel
 Robot Comics has announced that it will re-release Desert Peach titles on the Amazon Kindle.

References

External links
Don Markstein's Toonopedia: The Desert Peach

Comics publications
LGBT characters in comics
Fictional gay males
Fictional German people
Works about Nazi Germany
Cultural depictions of Erwin Rommel